The Division of Monash is an Australian Electoral Division in the state of Victoria, which was contested for the first time at the 2019 federal election.

Geography
Federal electoral division boundaries in Australia are determined at redistributions by a redistribution committee appointed by the Australian Electoral Commission. Redistributions occur for the boundaries of divisions in a particular state, and they occur every seven years, or sooner if a state's representation entitlement changes or when divisions of a state are malapportioned.

History

The division is named in honour of Sir John Monash, an Australian Allied military commander during World War I.

The Division of Monash is located in the western part of the Gippsland region, which extends for the length of Victoria's eastern Bass Strait coastline. It replaced the similarly-located Division of McMillan in 2018. Monash includes the towns of Warragul, Moe, Wonthaggi, Leongatha and Foster. The seat gained Phillip Island at the 2018 redistribution and overall it stretches from Mount Baw Baw and the Baw Baw National Park in the north to Wilsons Promontory, and the Wilsons Promontory National Park in the south. It is the southernmost Electoral Division in continental Australia. Monash was created in the mandatory redistribution of divisions in Victoria by the Australian Electoral Commission in 2018.

Prior to the 2022 federal election, the seat was notionally held by the Liberal Party of Australia on a margin of 6.9%, making it a fairly safe seat for the party. It is now held on a margin of 2.9%, making it marginal.

Members

Election results

2022 election 
The 2022 Australian federal election was held on 21 May 2022. Whilst many thought incumbent Liberal member Russell Broadbent would retire before the 2022 election due to his age and anti-vaccination stance,  he was preselected by the Liberal Party again and won the seat despite a swing of over 3.6% towards Labor's Jessica O'Donnell on a two-party preferred basis.

References

External links
 Division of Monash – Australian Electoral Commission

Electoral divisions of Australia
Constituencies established in 2019
2019 establishments in Australia
Yarra Ranges
Shire of Cardinia
City of Latrobe
Shire of Baw Baw
Shire of South Gippsland
Bass Coast Shire